is a Japanese animated movie produced by the new religious movement, Happy Science. It is an adaptation of a book by Ryuho Okawa, the CEO of Happy Science, and was released on October 17, 2009.

This movie was planned to be released internationally, dubbed into six languages and subtitled in twelve languages.

Plot
 is a 17-year-old sophomore at an all-girls high school. She aspires to become a journalist, like her father's late friend Tokuzo Kanemoto.

The plot is based around a prior event in which Kanemoto was shamed for publishing a false report. As a result, he committed suicide by jumping in front of a train.

After Kanemoto's death, Sayako develops the ability to see and interact with spirits. In one interaction, a spirit attempts to push her in front of a train and Sayako nearly dies.

The near-death experience awakens something in her. She becomes intent on understanding what really happened with Kanemoto and embarks on a quest to find answers. She is joined by Yuki Unabara, her best friend, Taiyou Sorano, a mysterious young man who possesses special powers; Mari Kimura, a young woman who works for the local news station; Harry Badson, an Australian-American spiritualist; and Shunta Amanokawa, an elementary school student and Sayako's younger brother; to find answers and discover the true identity of the mysterious "Buddha".

Characters
 :

References

External links

2000s Japanese-language films
2009 anime films
New Age media
Japanese animated fantasy films
2000s ghost films
2000s psychological films
Supernatural anime and manga
Television shows about spirit possession
Group TAC